was a vice admiral in the Imperial Japanese Navy.

Biography
Nagata was born in Edo present-day Tokyo where his father was a samurai. After attending the preparatory school Keio University he graduated from the 15th class of the Imperial Japanese Naval Academy in 1886. His classmates was the future Prime Minister Okada Keisuke and admirals Takeshita Isamu and Takarabe Takeshi.

He received his first command, that of the destroyer  on June 22, 1900. In September of the same year, he was promoted to lieutenant commander and reassigned as naval adjutant to the Government-General of Taiwan, serving in Taiwan to March 1902. He served in a number of staff positions, and was subsequently promoted to commander on January 12, 1905. During the Russo-Japanese War, he was Admiral Tōgō Heihachirō's  liaison with the civilian government in Tokyo.   

He served as chief-of-staff of the Ōminato Guard District from December 1910 to December 1911, was captain of the cruiser  from December 1911 to June 1912, and of the battlecruiser  from June 1912 to December 1913. He was then assigned as chief-of-staff of the Maizuru Naval District to December 1914. With the start of World War I, Nagata was captain of the battleship  from December 1914 until his promotion to rear admiral and reassignment as chief-of-staff of the IJN 2nd Fleet in December 1915. From December 1916 to 1917 he was chief-of-staff of the Yokosuka Naval District. Nagata served as Commander of the Interim Southern Islands Defense Unit from December 1917 to December 1919. He was promoted to vice admiral on December 1, 1919 and went on the reserve list in August 1920. He served as headmaster of the Kobe College of Mercantile Marine until his death in 1923.

Honors
1901 -  Order of the Sacred Treasure, 5th class
1906 -  Order of the Rising Sun, 3rd class
1906 -  Order of the Golden Kite, 3rd class

References

External links
 

1867 births
1923 deaths
Imperial Japanese Naval Academy alumni
Imperial Japanese Navy admirals
People from Musashi Province
Japanese military personnel of the Russo-Japanese War
Japanese military personnel of World War I
Members of the Government-General of Taiwan